Unspooled is a film podcast on the Earwolf network. It is hosted by film critic Amy Nicholson and actor/comedian Paul Scheer. Initially, the podcast covered the American Film Institute (AFI) Top 100 films. Later episodes of the podcast have covered other classic movies, with the ultimate goal of creating a list of the 100 best movies of all time. 


Format 
Each episode of Unspooled covers a single film and analyzes its artistic, thematic, and historical significance. Episodes begin with facts about the year the film was released and a summary of the cast and plot. As the hosts debate what works and what doesn't about each movie, they include audio excerpts from the film to illustrate their points, plus supplemental clips such as interviews with the director and cast. Scheer has described the podcast as a "book club where we are watching movies once a week."

Episodes wrap up with a negative review of the film from the time it was released. In Season 1, the show included clips of The Simpson's parodies of the film, if available, to demonstrate the film's continued cultural relevance. In Season 2, the show includes a clip of the top song on the Billboard charts the week of the film's release to examine the film's connection to the zeitgeist.

Reception 
Unspooled debuted at number 1 on iTunes Film & TV podcast rankings and number 4 on the iTunes overall top chart.

The podcast has garnered many positive reviews in the popular press. Esquire called it one of the best podcasts of 2019. Rolling Stone wrote that the show was "wildly entertaining" and ranked the show as one of the best podcasts of 2020. Town & Country Magazine lauded it as a "sharp, funny series…[with] charming chemistry," and Vanity Fair noted that the show's "fresh and intriguing takes on venerable movies make for entertaining listening." Vulture called it "funny and accessible." Another article in Vulture noted that "Unspooled is definitely among the best of [the good-film appreciation podcasts]." The AV Club described it as "both serious and silly," and The Hollywood Reporter listed the show as an essential film history podcast. IndieWire said that the podcast "provides an interesting context for what does or doesn't remain timeless in the movie world." Discover Pods referred to the show as "slightly more highbrow" than Scheer's companion podcast, How Did This Get Made?, while Emily VanDerWerff in Vox complemented its "entertaining segments … [while being] dedicated to placing these movies in their proper historical context."

Other critics have noted that the podcast is as an "absolute joy ... Scheer and Nicholson usually treat even the movies they don't care for with a measure of respect."

The podcast has been recognized for its willingness to take a critical eye to respected classics. One review commented that the show "fuels discussions of whether these movies are truly brilliant, or simply just respected because no one has ever questioned them." Another stated more directly, "Amy and Paul are not afraid to make the point: Do you really need so many movies about Vietnam?"

Episodes

Season 1, the AFI list 
The show began by going through each of the 2007 AFI's 100 Years...100 Movies beginning with Citizen Kane. For the first half of season 1, films were chosen by a random roll of a polyhedral die. At the end of the season, the hosts eliminated 60 films from the AFI list. Many were eliminated because of repeated directors or genres, particularly war films and Westerns. Other films were rejected because the director is believed to have made a better film that should fill the slot instead, such as replacing William Friedkin's The French Connection with The Exorcist. The trimmed list was published as the API List, an acronym of the hosts' names Amy and Paul.

Season 2 and beyond 
Following seasons of Unspooled have grouped films into thematic miniseries. Movies are chosen by the hosts and listeners with the goal of expanding the initial list to represent a more diverse, multi-faceted overview of cinema.

Specials, mini-episodes and live episodes 
Unspooled has produced annual episodes covering each year's Oscars and year-in-review series about the best films of that year. Other special episodes include live shows taped at film festivals and at the Alamo Drafthouse Cinema.

Unspooled also has an ongoing series of mini-episodes called Top 3. On Top 3, a guest is interviewed about the three movies they would add to the top 100 list.

List

The API List 

At the conclusion of Season 1, the hosts eliminated 60 movies from the AFI list and kept 40, publishing these selections as the core of their own "API" list (the "Amy and Paul Institute"), with the goal of again expanding the new list to 100 films, this time with an eye to gathering a more diverse representation of film creators and subjects than the AFI list offers. In the following seasons, additional films have been viewed and discussed, and added to the list. The hosts maintain that the collection, when complete, will be "shot into space" so that humanity's artistic endeavors can be shared with alien civilizations.

The API list currently includes 68 films; 40 of which were retained from the AFI list in the final episode of Season 1, 18 of which were added in the final episode of Season 2, and 13 of which were added in the final episode of Season 3, replacing 3 previously added films.

Notably, the hosts have attempted to include no more than one film by any particular director, but due to the variety and quality of their work three directors are currently featured twice: Alfred Hitchcock, Stanley Kubrick, and Billy Wilder.

The API List

Spinoffs

Screen Test 
Screen Test is an Unspooled film-themed game show hosted by Paul Scheer and Amy Nicholson. Contestants are tested on their "wits, bravado, and collaboration—the three necessities if you want to make it in Hollywood." The show launched in October 2020 on Stitcher, with some episodes airing live on Paul Scheer's Twitch Channel, FriendZone.

Spool Party 
Spool Party is a live stream that focuses on fan favorite films with special guests. Episodes premiere live on YouTube. Shows have featured the films Big, Clue, and Clueless. One episode featured a House Party reunion with director Reginald Hudlin and Christopher "Play" Reid.

References

External links 

 
 

Audio podcasts
Earwolf
Film and television podcasts
2018 podcast debuts